The International Day of Mathematics is 14 March. It is also known as the Pi Day, because the mathematical constant  (pi) can be rounded down to 3.14.

UNESCO's 40th General Conference decided Pi Day as the International Day of Mathematics in November 2019.

See also 
  (pi)
 Pi Day

References

External links 
Official website of the International Day of Mathematics
 UNESCO page on the International Day of Mathematics
 数学漫谈 (A Tour  of Mathematics),  a public lecture (in Chinese) delivered by Professor Ya-xiang Yuan (President of International Council for Industrial and Applied Mathematics) on 14 March 2020, the first International Day of Mathematics (slides)

Mathematics and culture
Pi